Dorset Township is one of the twenty-seven townships of Ashtabula County, Ohio, United States. The 2010 census found 846 people in the township.

Geography
Located in the eastern part of the county, it borders the following townships:
Denmark Township - north
Pierpont Township - northeast corner
Richmond Township - east
Andover Township - southeast corner
Cherry Valley Township - south
New Lyme Township - southwest corner
Lenox Township - west
Jefferson Township - northwest corner

No municipalities are located in Dorset Township, although the unincorporated community of Dorset lies in the center of the township.

Climate

Name and history
It is the only Dorset Township statewide.

Government
The township is governed by a three-member board of trustees, who are elected in November of odd-numbered years to a four-year term beginning on the following January 1. Two are elected in the year after the presidential election and one is elected in the year before it. There is also an elected township fiscal officer, who serves a four-year term beginning on April 1 of the year after the election, which is held in November of the year before the presidential election. Vacancies in the fiscal officership or on the board of trustees are filled by the remaining trustees.  Currently, the board is composed of chairman Herbert Dean and members James Bailey and Jeffrey Hinkle.

References

External links
County website

Townships in Ashtabula County, Ohio
English-American culture in Ohio
Townships in Ohio